Jiang Tingting (born 25 September 1986 in Chengdu, Sichuan) is a Chinese synchronized swimmer.

She competed at the 2008 Olympics in the duet event with her twin sister Jiang Wenwen and the teams event. She also competed in the teams event at the 2012 Olympics.

References

External links 

 
 
 
 

1986 births
Living people
Chinese synchronized swimmers
Olympic synchronized swimmers of China
Olympic medalists in synchronized swimming
Olympic silver medalists for China
Olympic bronze medalists for China
Synchronized swimmers at the 2008 Summer Olympics
Synchronized swimmers at the 2012 Summer Olympics
Medalists at the 2008 Summer Olympics
Medalists at the 2012 Summer Olympics
Asian Games medalists in artistic swimming
Asian Games gold medalists for China
Artistic swimmers at the 2006 Asian Games
Artistic swimmers at the 2010 Asian Games
Artistic swimmers at the 2018 Asian Games
Medalists at the 2006 Asian Games
Medalists at the 2010 Asian Games
Medalists at the 2018 Asian Games
World Aquatics Championships medalists in synchronised swimming
Synchronized swimmers at the 2005 World Aquatics Championships
Synchronized swimmers at the 2007 World Aquatics Championships
Synchronized swimmers at the 2009 World Aquatics Championships
Synchronized swimmers at the 2011 World Aquatics Championships
Synchronized swimmers at the 2013 World Aquatics Championships
Synchronized swimmers at the 2017 World Aquatics Championships
Sportspeople from Chengdu
Synchronized swimmers from Sichuan
Twin sportspeople
Chinese twins